C.S. kwartier is the central neighborhood of Rotterdam, Netherlands, immediately surrounding Rotterdam Centraal Station. 

Neighbourhoods of Rotterdam